Thecostraca is a class of marine invertebrates containing over 2,200 described species. Many species have planktonic larvae which become sessile or parasitic as adults.

The most important subgroup are the barnacles (subclass Cirripedia), constituting a little over 2,100 known species.

The subgroup Facetotecta contains a single genus, Hansenocaris, known only from the tiny planktonic nauplii called "y-larvae". These larvae have no known adult form, though it is suspected that they are parasites, and their affinity is uncertain. Some researchers believe that they may be larval tantulocaridans. No larval tantulocaridans are currently known.

The group Ascothoracida contains about 110 species, all parasites of coelenterates and echinoderms.

Classification
This article follows Chan et al. (2021) and the World Register of Marine Species in placing Thecostraca as a class of Crustacea and in the following classification of thecostracans down to the level of orders. Previously, Thecostraca was considered a subclass of Maxillopoda. Significant changes in the organization of Cirripedia's orders, families, and genera were introduced in 2021 by Chan et al. and accepted by the World Register of Marine Species.

Class Thecostraca Gruvel, 1905
 Subclass Ascothoracida Lacaze-Duthiers, 1880
 Order Laurida Grygier, 1987
 Order Dendrogastrida Grygier, 1987
 Subclass Facetotecta Grygier, 1985
 Subclass Cirripedia Burmeister, 1834
 Infraclass Acrothoracica Gruvel, 1905
 Order Lithoglyptida Kolbasov, Newman & Hoeg, 2009
 Order Cryptophialida Kolbasov, Newman & Hoeg, 2009
 Infraclass Rhizocephala Müller, 1862
 Infraclass Thoracica Darwin, 1854 
 Superorder Phosphatothoracica Gale, 2019 (paraphyletic)
 Order Eolepadomorpha Chan et al., 2021 
 Order Iblomorpha Buckeridge & Newman, 2006
 Superorder Thoracicalcarea Gale, 2015
 Order Calanticomorpha Chan et al., 2021
 Order Brachylepadomorpha Withers, 1923 
 Order Archaeolepadomorpha Chan et al., 2021 
 Order Verrucomorpha Pilsbry, 1916
 Order Scalpellomorpha Buckeridge & Newman, 2006
 Order Pollicipedomorpha Chan et al., 2021
 Order Balanomorpha Pilsbry, 1916

Phylogeny
The following cladogram depicts the internal relationships of the Thecostraca as of 2021.

References

External links

Arthropod classes